Rapona is a monotypic genus of flowering plants belonging to the family Convolvulaceae. The only species is Rapona tiliifolia.

Its native range is Madagascar.

References

Convolvulaceae
Monotypic Convolvulaceae genera